Visa policy of Mercosur member states may refer to:

Visa policy of Argentina
Visa policy of Brazil
Visa policy of Paraguay
Visa policy of Venezuela
Visa policy of Uruguay

Mutual visa policy among Mercosur members

See also 
 Mercosur

References 

Mercosur
Foreign relations of Argentina
Foreign relations of Brazil
Foreign relations of Paraguay
Foreign relations of Uruguay
Mercosur